Luis Ortiz Rosales (died 1937) was a Spanish illustrator, draughtsman, painter, and graphic artist.  Born in the Canary Islands, he created numerous posters and drawings that earned him national fame. He created the drawings for Luis Buñuel's surrealist film L'Âge d'Or (1930).

After the outbreak of the Spanish Civil War, although a Falangist, he was imprisoned and then shot at a Nationalist concentration camp in 1937. The overcrowded prison had been a former Fyffes warehouse where bananas had been stored.

External links
 Arrasaron la cultura popular

Year of birth missing
1937 deaths
Spanish illustrators
Spanish surrealist artists
20th-century Spanish painters
20th-century Spanish male artists
Spanish male painters
Spanish poster artists
People executed by Spain by firearm
Spanish people of the Spanish Civil War
Artists from the Canary Islands
Executed Spanish people
People executed by Francoist Spain